Puerto Bandera  is a settlement and municipality located on the shores of Lago Argentino lake,  in Santa Cruz Province, southern Argentina.

References

Populated places in Santa Cruz Province, Argentina